Events in the year 1835 in Bolivia.

Incumbents 
 President: Andrés de Santa Cruz
 Vice President:
 José Miguel de Velasco (until 23 July)
 Mariano Enrique Calvo (starting 23 July)

Ongoing events 
 Salaverry-Santa Cruz War (1835–1836)

Events

June 
 15 June – Salaverry-Santa Cruz War: President Santa Cruz and Anselmo Quiroz, representing Peruvian President Luis José de Orbegoso, sign a treaty in La Paz authorizing Bolivia to intervene in Peru.

July 
 23 July – Mariano Enrique Calvo is appointed as the 3rd vice president of Bolivia, succeeding José Miguel de Velasco.

August 
 13 August – Salaverry-Santa Cruz War – Battle of Yanacocha: A united Peru-Bolivian army commanded by Andrés de Santa Cruz defeats Agustín Gamarra at Yanacocha.
 16 August – Santa Cruz is elected Constitutional President of the Republic by the parish electoral boards.

Births

Deaths

Citations

Bibliography 

 
1800s in Bolivia
Bolivia
Bolivia
Years of the 19th century in Bolivia